Bani Naameh-ye Shomali (also Romanized as Banī Na‘āmeh-ye Shomālī) is a village in Neysan Rural District, Neysan District, Hoveyzeh County, Khuzestan Province, Iran. At the 2006 census, its population was 582, in 73 families.

References 

Populated places in Hoveyzeh County